Tundla Junction is an important station in Uttar Pradesh. It is located on the Delhi–Howrah main line 25 km from Agra City. Tundla is a technical halt for changing drivers and guards for almost all of the trains on the New Delhi–Mughalsarai / Lucknow sections. The station was built by the British and remains essentially unchanged. The railway station is a site in itself and takes one back to the pre-independence era.

Tundla Junction is important for the people of Agra and for tourists providing connections to the east of the country, i.e. Kolkata, Guwahati, Patna etc., and especially to the northern state of Uttar Pradesh.
It has connections to Agra Cantonment, Badaun, Bareilly Junction, Etawah, Aligarh Junction, Phaphund, Kanpur Central railway station etc.

History
 1972: Electrification from Howrah reaches Tundla.
 29 December 2002: Konkan Railway conducts a trial run of the Madgaon–Roha Express at 150 km/h (briefly touching 165 km/h at times) using a WDP-4 loco. In December, NR is said to have run trials with a WDP-4 hauling at train at up to 180 km/h on the Ghaziabad–Tundla section.
 13–21 December 2003: Trials with weak field arrangement for MEMUs on the Tundla–Kanpur section of NCR. With a "dense crush load" and stopping at all stations, a 4-car MEMU rake could reducee its total running time by 7% with a maximum speed of 90 km/h and 10% with a maximum speed of 100 km/h on the 228 km section, because of the improved acceleration.

References

External links

Railway junction stations in Uttar Pradesh
Railway stations in Firozabad district
Allahabad railway division